Richard Fraser (July 11, 1954 – November 16, 2020) was a Canadian professional ice hockey defenceman who played in the World Hockey Association (WHA).

Career 
Drafted in the tenth round of the 1974 NHL amateur draft by the Chicago Black Hawks, Fraser opted to play in the WHA after being selected by the Indianapolis Racers in the seventeenth round of the 1974 WHA Amateur Draft. He played four games for the Racers during the 1974–75 WHA season. He was the younger brother of former National Hockey League referee Kerry Fraser.

Personal life 
Fraser died on November 16, 2020, of cancer at the age of 66.

References

External links

1954 births
2020 deaths
Canadian ice hockey defencemen
Chicago Blackhawks draft picks
Sportspeople from Sarnia
Indianapolis Racers draft picks
Indianapolis Racers players
Mohawk Valley Comets (NAHL) players
Oshawa Generals players
Port Huron Flags (IHL) players
Toledo Goaldiggers players
Ice hockey people from Ontario
Deaths from cancer in Ontario